World Bee Day is celebrated on May 20. On this day Anton Janša, the pioneer of beekeeping, was born in 1734.

The purpose of the international day is to acknowledge the role of bees and other pollinators for the ecosystem.

The UN Member States approved Slovenia’s proposal to proclaim 20 May as World Bee Day in December 2017.

External links 
 Official webpage

References 

Beekeeping
May events
United Nations days